Patricia Elizabeth Easterling, FBA (née Fairfax; born 11 March 1934) is an English classical scholar, recognised as a particular expert on the work of Sophocles. She was Regius Professor of Greek at the University of Cambridge from 1994 to 2001. She was the 36th person and the first — and, so far, only — woman to hold the post.

Life and career
Born in Blackburn, Easterling attended Witton Park High School (originally called Blackburn High School for Girls) before graduating with first class honours and distinction in Classics at Newnham College, Cambridge in 1955. After an initial spell lecturing at the University of Manchester (1957–1958), Easterling taught within the Cambridge Classics Faculty as a Fellow of Newnham College until 1987 when she took up the position of Professor of Greek at University College London. In 1987, she also became an Honorary Fellow of Newnham College. She gave the inaugural Housman Lecture at University College London on 14 June 2005.

Easterling was the first woman to chair the Council of University Classical Departments. In 1994, she returned to Cambridge and Newnham as the 36th Regius Professor of Greek, the first (and so far only) woman to hold that post since its endowment by Henry VIII.

In 1998, Easterling was elected a Fellow of the British Academy, and in 2013 was made associé étranger de l'Académie des Inscriptions et Belles-Lettres at the Institut de France, and Honorary Member of the Hungarian Academy of Sciences. She was the first Chair of the Management Committee of the Cambridge Greek Lexicon Project, and is a patron of the charity 'Classics for All'.

On 22 January 2000, Easterling received an honorary doctorate from the Faculty of Languages at Uppsala University, Sweden. She has also been awarded honorary doctorates by the universities of Athens, Bristol (1999), Royal Holloway (University of London) and Ioannina, and has been an Honorary Fellow of University College London since 1997.

Academic interests
Easterling works mainly on Greek literature, particularly tragedy; she also studies the survival and reception of ancient drama. She has had a long association with the Joint Association of Classical Teachers and with its Greek Summer School at Bryanston School in Dorset, giving lectures there on an occasional basis.

Easterling has been a General Editor of the Cambridge Greek and Latin Classics series since its foundation over thirty years ago, and has published an edition within this series of Sophocles’ Trachiniae (1982).

Publications
Books
 Sophocles: Trachiniae, edited, Cambridge, 1982
 Greek Religion and Society, edited with J. V. Muir, 1984
 The Cambridge History of Classical Literature, General editor with E. J. Kenney
 The Cambridge Companion to Greek Tragedy, Editor, 1997
 Greek Scripts: An Illustrated Introduction, edited with Carol Handley (Society for the Promotion of Hellenic Studies, 2001)
 Greek and Roman Actors: Aspects of an Ancient Profession, edited with Edith Hall, 2002
 Sophocles: Electra and Other Plays (Penguin, 2008)
Articles
 'Constructing the Heroic' in Christopher Pelling, Greek Tragedy and the Historian, Oxford, 1997: 21–37
 'The Infanticide in Euripides' Medea', Yale Classical Studies 25 (1977): 177–191
 "From Repertoire to Canon." in Easterling, P. E. (ed.) Cambridge Companion to Greek Tragedy, 1997, pp. 211–227.
 "Narrative on the Greek Tragic Stage." Defining Greek Narrative, 2014, pp. 226–240.

References

External links
 Cambridge University database
 Profile of P. E. Easterling
 Picture of P. E. Easterling
 Homer, Tragedy and Beyond: Essays in honour of P. E. Easterling, New Hellenic Society 1991
 Sophocles and the Greek Tragic Tradition: Essays in honour of P. E. Easterling on her 75th birthday. Cambridge University Press 2009 
 British Academy fellowship entry

1934 births
Academics of University College London
Alumni of Newnham College, Cambridge
Fellows of Newnham College, Cambridge
English classical scholars
Fellows of the British Academy
Living people
Members of the University of Cambridge faculty of classics
Regius Professors of Greek (Cambridge)
Women classical scholars
Presidents of the Classical Association